Gemma is a surname. Notable people with the name include:

Alfred A. Gemma (born 1939), American politician
Andrea Gemma (1931–2019), Italian Roman Catholic bishop
Chiara Maria Gemma (born 1968), Italian politician
Cornelius Gemma (1535–1578), Dutch physician, astronomer and astrologer
Giuliano Gemma, (1938–2013), Italian actor
Roberta Gemma (born 1980), Italian actress
Vera Gemma, Italian film actress

See also
Gemma (given name)